Pediasia persellus is a species of moth in the family Crambidae described by Sergiusz Graf von Toll in 1947. It is found in the Ural, Asia Minor and Iran.

References

Moths described in 1947
Crambini
Moths of Europe
Moths of Asia